Bymovirus is a genus of viruses, in the family Potyviridae. Plants serve as natural hosts. There are six species in this genus.

Taxonomy
The genus contains the following species:
 Barley mild mosaic virus
 Barley yellow mosaic virus
 Oat mosaic virus
 Rice necrosis mosaic virus
 Wheat spindle streak mosaic virus
 Wheat yellow mosaic virus

Structure
Viruses in Bymovirus are non-enveloped, with flexuous and  Filamentous geometries. The diameter is around 12-15 nm, with a length of 500-600 and 200-300 nm. Genomes are linear and bipartite, around 23.5-3.8kb in length.

Life cycle
Viral replication is cytoplasmic. Entry into the host cell is achieved by penetration into the host cell. Replication follows the positive stranded RNA virus replication model. Positive stranded RNA virus transcription is the method of transcription. The virus exits the host cell by tubule-guided viral movement.
Plants serve as the natural host. The virus is transmitted via a vector (fungus; plasmodiophorales). Transmission routes are vector, mechanical, and oral.

References

External links
 Viralzone: Bymovirus
 ICTV

Potyviridae
Virus genera